Bent Gate is a suburb of Haslingden, Lancashire, England, approximately one mile south of Haslingden town centre. Haslingden Cricket Club's ground, called Bentgate, has been here since 1853.

Gallery

References

Villages in Lancashire
Geography of the Borough of Rossendale